Live at Mister Kelly's, often stylized as "Live" (At Mr. Kelly's), is a live album by blues musician Muddy Waters released by the Chess label in 1971.

Reception

Rolling Stone said "All in all, it’s a rainy night sounding, laid-back album with the emphasis on good solid blues" AllMusic reviewer Bruce Eder stated "Muddy Waters Live (At Mr. Kelly's) shows precisely how fortuitous Muddy Waters' history with Chess Records was. ... This album, recorded during two June 1971 gigs at one of Chicago's top clubs, was the third full-length concert release of his career ... The core of the band that would work with him for the rest of the '70s was already with him, and the man himself was in excellent form -- in voice and on slide guitar ... the effect of hearing a master of the blues virtuoso band in action is overpowering".

Track listing 
All compositions by McKinley Morganfield except where noted
 "What Is That She Got" – 4:30
 "You Don't Have to Go" (Jimmy Reed) – 3:25
 "Strange Woman" (Morganfield, Ralph Bass) – 5:00
 "Blow Wind Blow" – 4:30
 "Country Boy" – 4:58
 "Nine Below Zero" (Sonny Boy Williamson) – 4:45
 "Stormy Monday Blues" (Aaron Walker) – 4:38
 "Mudcat" – 3:37
 "Boom, Boom" (John Lee Hooker) – 4:38
 "C.C. Woman" – 3:45

Personnel 
Muddy Waters – vocals, guitar
Joe "Denim" (tracks 1, 3 & 9), Paul Oscher – harmonica
Pinetop Perkins – piano
Sam Lawhorn, Pee Wee Madison – guitar
Calvin Jones – bass
Willie Smith – drums

References 

1971 live albums
Muddy Waters live albums
Chess Records live albums
Albums produced by Ralph Bass